Tshotlego Morama, born in Lethakane in 1987, is a Botswana Paralympic sprinter.

Representing Botswana at the 2004 Summer Paralympics in Athens, she won gold in the women's 400m sprint in the T46 disability category, setting a new world record in the process, with a time of 55.99. She remains the only athlete ever to have represented Botswana at the Paralympics.

Morama also won gold at the 2007 All-Africa Games, setting a new African record in the women's 200 metres.

Morama was due to represent Botswana again at the 2008 Summer Paralympics in Beijing, but ultimately did not compete, having withdrawn prior to the Games due to injury.

References

Living people
1987 births
Paralympic athletes of Botswana
Athletes (track and field) at the 2004 Summer Paralympics
Athletes (track and field) at the 2008 Summer Paralympics
Paralympic gold medalists for Botswana
Medalists at the 2004 Summer Paralympics
Track and field athletes with disabilities
Botswana female sprinters
Paralympic medalists in athletics (track and field)